Laurie "Lol" Crawley  (born in Shrewsbury, Shropshire), is an English cinematographer. His works include Ballast, Four Lions, and The Crimson Petal and the White.

In 2013, Crawley shot Mandela: Long Walk to Freedom, which was shown at the Toronto International Film Festival and has attracted critical attention for its cinematography.
Crawley has been inducted into the British Society of Cinematographers.  He has been awarded two cinematography awards at film festivals, and also has been nominated for a 2014 Film Independent Spirit Award.

In 2016 The Playlist profiled Crawley in their filmmakers on the rise stating that, "British DP Lol Crawley isn’t quite a brand new name — he’s been doing some remarkably impressive work in features for nearly a decade now. But of late, he’s gone from an extraordinarily impressive cinematographer to staking his claim at being one of the best in the world."

Filmography 
Feature films

Television

Music videos

Awards 
2008 Sundance Film Festival  Excellence in Cinematography Award for Ballast
2009 Independent Spirit Awards Best Cinematography  for Ballast (nomination)
2010 UK Music Video Awards Best Cinematography for Plan B - Stay Too Long (Music Video)
2010 Design and Art Direction Awards Best Cinematography (Nominated) for Plan B - Stay Too Long (Music Video)
2011 Woodstock Film Festival  Best Cinematography for On the Ice
2014 Royal Television Society  Photography - Drama for Utopia''

References

External links
 

1974 births
British cinematographers
Living people
People from Shrewsbury